CAS2 is an airport code for Moose Lake (Lodge) Airport.

CAS2 may refer to:

Double compare-and-swap, in computers, machine level instruction
CAS Latency, Column Access Strobe, a timing associated with some kinds of computer memory
cas2, CRISPR-associated protein 2